Romanovo is the name of several rural localities in Russia.

Altai Krai
As of 2010, four rural localities in Altai Krai bear this name:
Romanovo, Kosikhinsky District, Altai Krai, a selo in Kontoshinsky Selsoviet of Kosikhinsky District
Romanovo, Pankrushikhinsky District, Altai Krai, a selo in Romanovsky Selsoviet of Pankrushikhinsky District
Romanovo, Romanovsky District, Altai Krai, a selo in Romanovsky Selsoviet of Romanovsky District
Romanovo, Ust-Pristansky District, Altai Krai, a selo in Brusentsevsky Selsoviet of Ust-Pristansky District

Arkhangelsk Oblast
As of 2010, one rural locality in Arkhangelsk Oblast bears this name:
Romanovo, Arkhangelsk Oblast, a village in Usachevsky Selsoviet of Kargopolsky District

Republic of Buryatia
As of 2010, one rural locality in the Republic of Buryatia bears this name:
Romanovo, Republic of Buryatia, a selo in Krasnoyarsky Selsoviet of Kabansky District

Ivanovo Oblast
As of 2010, four rural localities in Ivanovo Oblast bear this name:
Romanovo, Kineshemsky District, Ivanovo Oblast, a village in Kineshemsky District
Romanovo, Pestyakovsky District, Ivanovo Oblast, a village in Pestyakovsky District
Romanovo, Rodnikovsky District, Ivanovo Oblast, a village in Rodnikovsky District
Romanovo, Yuryevetsky District, Ivanovo Oblast, a village in Yuryevetsky District

Kaliningrad Oblast
As of 2010, one rural locality in Kaliningrad Oblast bears this name:
Romanovo, Kaliningrad Oblast, a settlement in Kovrovsky Rural Okrug of Zelenogradsky District

Kaluga Oblast
As of 2010, one rural locality in Kaluga Oblast bears this name:
Romanovo, Kaluga Oblast, a village in Medynsky District

Kirov Oblast
As of 2010, two rural localities in Kirov Oblast bear this name:
Romanovo, Podosinovsky District, Kirov Oblast, a village in Utmanovsky Rural Okrug of Podosinovsky District
Romanovo, Verkhnekamsky District, Kirov Oblast, a village in Kaysky Rural Okrug of Verkhnekamsky District

Kostroma Oblast
As of 2010, two rural localities in Kostroma Oblast bear this name:
Romanovo, Antropovsky District, Kostroma Oblast, a village in Palkinskoye Settlement of Antropovsky District
Romanovo, Sudislavsky District, Kostroma Oblast, a village in Raslovskoye Settlement of Sudislavsky District

Kurgan Oblast
As of 2010, one rural locality in Kurgan Oblast bears this name:
Romanovo, Kurgan Oblast, a village in Pishchalsky Selsoviet of Polovinsky District

Kursk Oblast
As of 2010, two rural localities in Kursk Oblast bear this name:
Romanovo, Khomutovsky District, Kursk Oblast, a selo in Romanovsky Selsoviet of Khomutovsky District
Romanovo, Rylsky District, Kursk Oblast, a village in Nekrasovsky Selsoviet of Rylsky District

Lipetsk Oblast
As of 2010, one rural locality in Lipetsk Oblast bears this name:
Romanovo, Lipetsk Oblast, a selo in Olkhovsky Selsoviet of Lebedyansky District

Moscow Oblast
As of 2010, one rural locality in Moscow Oblast bears this name:
Romanovo, Moscow Oblast, a village in Ateptsevskoye Rural Settlement of Naro-Fominsky District

Nizhny Novgorod Oblast
As of 2010, three rural localities in Nizhny Novgorod Oblast bear this name:
Romanovo, Chkalovsky District, Nizhny Novgorod Oblast, a village in Purekhovsky Selsoviet of Chkalovsky District
Romanovo, Gorodetsky District, Nizhny Novgorod Oblast, a village in Kovriginsky Selsoviet of Gorodetsky District
Romanovo, Koverninsky District, Nizhny Novgorod Oblast, a village in Bolshemostovsky Selsoviet of Koverninsky District

Novosibirsk Oblast
As of 2010, one rural locality in Novosibirsk Oblast bears this name:
Romanovo, Novosibirsk Oblast, a selo in Cherepanovsky District

Perm Krai
As of 2010, two rural localities in Perm Krai bear this name:
Romanovo, Ilyinsky District, Perm Krai, a village in Ilyinsky District
Romanovo, Usolsky District, Perm Krai, a selo in Usolsky District

Pskov Oblast
As of 2010, four rural localities in Pskov Oblast bear this name:
Romanovo, Bezhanitsky District, Pskov Oblast, a village in Bezhanitsky District
Romanovo (Vorontsovskaya Rural Settlement), Ostrovsky District, Pskov Oblast, a village in Ostrovsky District; municipally, a part of Vorontsovskaya Rural Settlement of that district
Romanovo (Volkovskaya Rural Settlement), Ostrovsky District, Pskov Oblast, a village in Ostrovsky District; municipally, a part of Volkovskaya Rural Settlement of that district
Romanovo, Pushkinogorsky District, Pskov Oblast, a village in Pushkinogorsky District

Ryazan Oblast
As of 2010, one rural locality in Ryazan Oblast bears this name:
Romanovo, Ryazan Oblast, a selo in Davydovsky Rural Okrug of Klepikovsky District

Sverdlovsk Oblast
As of 2010, one rural locality in Sverdlovsk Oblast bears this name:
Romanovo, Sverdlovsk Oblast, a selo in Serovsky District

Tula Oblast
As of 2010, one rural locality in Tula Oblast bears this name:
Romanovo, Tula Oblast, a selo in Krasnoyarsky Rural Okrug of Kireyevsky District

Tver Oblast
As of 2010, eight rural localities in Tver Oblast bear this name:
Romanovo, Mednovskoye Rural Settlement, Kalininsky District, Tver Oblast, a village in Mednovskoye Rural Settlement of Kalininsky District
Romanovo, Slavnovskoye Rural Settlement, Kalininsky District, Tver Oblast, a village in Slavnovskoye Rural Settlement of Kalininsky District
Romanovo, Kalyazinsky District, Tver Oblast, a village in Nerlskoye Rural Settlement of Kalyazinsky District
Romanovo, Kimrsky District, Tver Oblast, a village in Neklyudovskoye Rural Settlement of Kimrsky District
Romanovo, Oleninsky District, Tver Oblast, a village in Gusevskoye Rural Settlement of Oleninsky District
Romanovo, Staritsky District, Tver Oblast, a village in Stepurinskoye Rural Settlement of Staritsky District
Romanovo, Toropetsky District, Tver Oblast, a village in Ploskoshskoye Rural Settlement of Toropetsky District
Romanovo, Zapadnodvinsky District, Tver Oblast, a village in Starotoropskoye Rural Settlement of Zapadnodvinsky District

Udmurt Republic
As of 2010, one rural locality in the Udmurt Republic bears this name:
Romanovo, Udmurt Republic, a village in Bolgurinsky Selsoviet of Votkinsky District

Vladimir Oblast
As of 2010, two rural localities in Vladimir Oblast bear this name:
Romanovo, Alexandrovsky District, Vladimir Oblast, a village in Alexandrovsky District
Romanovo, Suzdalsky District, Vladimir Oblast, a selo in Suzdalsky District

Vologda Oblast
As of 2010, four rural localities in Vologda Oblast bear this name:
Romanovo, Musorsky Selsoviet, Cherepovetsky District, Vologda Oblast, a village in Musorsky Selsoviet of Cherepovetsky District
Romanovo, Voskresensky Selsoviet, Cherepovetsky District, Vologda Oblast, a village in Voskresensky Selsoviet of Cherepovetsky District
Romanovo, Novlensky Selsoviet, Vologodsky District, Vologda Oblast, a village in Novlensky Selsoviet of Vologodsky District
Romanovo, Staroselsky Selsoviet, Vologodsky District, Vologda Oblast, a village in Staroselsky Selsoviet of Vologodsky District

Yaroslavl Oblast
As of 2010, two rural localities in Yaroslavl Oblast bear this name:
Romanovo, Perelessky Rural Okrug, Pereslavsky District, Yaroslavl Oblast, a selo in Perelessky Rural Okrug of Pereslavsky District
Romanovo, Smolensky Rural Okrug, Pereslavsky District, Yaroslavl Oblast, a selo in Smolensky Rural Okrug of Pereslavsky District

See also
Romanov (disambiguation)
Roman (disambiguation)